Martin Tyler (born 14 September 1945) is an English football commentator and semi-professional football coach. He has worked as a commentator for Sky Sports since 1990, covering the Premier League and UEFA Champions League, as well as other domestic and international competitions. Tyler had previously commentated for ITV in the 1970s and 1980s. He provided his voice to the football video game series FIFA from 2005 until 2019. In 2003, he was voted the FA Premier League Commentator of the Decade.

Football commentary career 
After graduating from the University of East Anglia in the 1960s, Tyler helped in the publishing of Marshall Cavendish's Book of Football. He was also ghostwriter on football pundit Jimmy Hill's column in The Times and reported matches under his own name for that paper.

At the urging of Hill he took a job behind the scenes on LWT's The Big Match – which had been established in 1968. His job was solely a production role, but at one match he did his own commentary on a tape recorder and handed it in to his bosses expecting, and indeed initially gaining, little response.

However, the break did eventually come with another ITV region Southern Television. Their regular football commentator (and ITV's tennis man) Gerry Williams was indisposed and on 28 December 1974 Tyler made his commentary debut at The Dell describing a Second Division clash between Southampton and Sheffield Wednesday. It was a successful bow and six weeks later he was asked back, soon becoming a regular commentator.

In 1976, Tyler moved to Yorkshire Television and began to make an impression on ITV Sport bosses, who included him in the team for the 1978 World Cup. Another change of region came in 1981 as Tyler moved to Granada in his native North West. In 1982, he led ITV's World Cup team, covering every England game and the final alongside Ian St. John. The tournament was also memorable on a personal level because he met his future wife while on duty in Spain.

Throughout the 1980s, Tyler established himself as the ITV network's number two commentator behind Brian Moore. He led the team at the 1984 European Championships and also described all the main matches at the 1986 World Cup – except the final, for which Moore flew out from London (the first time he had ever commentated on a World Cup match for ITV, having previously worked from London as anchorman). From 1983 ITV began to show live Football League matches, with Tyler involved in several such broadcasts over the next seven years.

BSkyB (Sky Sports) 
It was the frustration of playing second fiddle that saw Tyler search for new pastures and, despite his own reluctance, he signed a deal with British Satellite Broadcasting's Sports Channel in 1990 at the urging of his agent John Hockey. There he covered live FA Cup games, England internationals and the Scottish League. Tyler's voice was still heard on ITV for another two years as they carried the commentaries he provided for the Football League's overseas broadcasts. British Satellite Broadcasting's merger with Sky meant the Sports Channel became Sky Sports in 1991. Since then he has led the Sky commentary team, spearheading the network's coverage of the FA Premier League since its inception in 1992.

In April 2003, in the Premier League 10 Seasons Awards, Tyler was voted as the Premier League Commentator of The Decade by fans and a specially assembled panel of football experts. After learning of the honour Tyler stated, "I'd like to thank everybody who voted for me and express my gratitude to all my colleagues at Sky Sports. This award is as much for them as myself and reflects our approach to football. My job has also been made easier by the thousands of individuals within the game who've answered my daily requests for information with the attention and care that make this job so enjoyable."

In 2005, Sky began a rotation policy with their leading commentators. Top matches were shared more equally between Tyler, Alan Parry, Rob Hawthorne and Ian Darke – who had returned to football on a regular basis after ten years prioritising boxing. Hawthorne covered the 2005 UEFA Champions League Final for the network. Doubts about the security of his position as Sky's number one commentator alerted rival broadcasting corporations. In January 2007 he was approached by Setanta to be their lead commentator for live Premiership football in 2007–08, but rejected the move and signed a new contract with Sky Sports.

Premier League Productions 

When he is not working for Sky, Tyler can be heard commentating for Premier League Productions, the Premier League's production arm which is responsible for producing, packaging and broadcasting the matches for the Premier League's international broadcast partners. Generally Tyler covers the Monday night matches for the international audience.

SBS (Australia) 

Since 1990, Tyler has been the main voice for broadcasts on the Australian television network SBS for World Cup, Euro Football Championship and European club competition matches as well as a number of Australian international matches. With the exception of 2010, when he worked for ESPN in the United States, he has now covered eight World Cup Finals for SBS.

United States of America and Canada 

Fox used Tyler's Sky commentary to cover the 2010 UEFA Champions League Final. This is the first time the Champions League final was broadcast on a major American television network. In addition, he led ESPN's coverage of the 2010 FIFA World Cup and was set to return for the 2014 tournament. However, on 8 January 2014, ESPN and Tyler announced they had mutually agreed to part ways ahead of the 2014 World Cup so that he can focus on Premier League games live on Sky Sports.

Other work 

Having established himself as a leading ITV commentator in the 1980s, Tyler also took on a large amount of freelance work. He has worked for Screensport, commentating on the Freight Rover Trophy Area in 1985 and the Screensport Super Cup in 1986, as well as several South American qualifying matches for the 1990 World Cup.

Between 1986 and 1990, Tyler was a regular voice on Octagon CSI's international feed of Serie A along with Peter Brackley. In May 1988, he was the commentator on Sky Television's first football match coverage - a friendly between Manchester United and AC Milan at Old Trafford (the channel had previously broadcast externally produced highlights packages).

With his Sky Sports colleague Alan Smith and the former Arsenal and West Ham United player Stewart Robson, Tyler commentated on the English-language international coverage of the UEFA Champions League and the UEFA Euro since the 2015-16 season, managed by UEFA and IMG as well as the FA Cup and the Community Shield managed by the FA and IMG.

Other sports
Although mostly associated with football, Tyler has commentated on other sports. He contributed to Granada TV's cricket coverage of Roses Match's  throughout his time there, and  described action from live netball for ITV's World of Sport. In the mid-1980s, Tyler also anchored Channel 4's coverage of baseball's World Series.

Film and video games 
Tyler was the default commentator for the FIFA video game series from 2005 to 2020, alongside Andy Gray between 2005 and 2010 and Alan Smith from 2011 to 2020.
Tyler also appeared in the 2005 movie Goal as a commentator.

Football coaching 

Tyler has worked as a coach for a number of teams managed by Alan Dowson. In 2005, he joined Walton & Hersham and has since worked with Dowson at Kingstonian and Hampton & Richmond Borough. In May 2018, he followed Dowson to National League club Woking, a team he has supported since he was young. Following the departure of Dowson in late February 2022, Tyler also opted to leave the club, concluding a four-year spell with the Surrey-based side.

Ahead of the 2022–23 season, Tyler linked up with Dowson again and became a coach at Dartford.

Legacy
Tyler is known for his role in multiple instances of iconic football commentary, including:

 Michael Essien's worldie against Arsenal in December 2006.
 His commentary of Andrey Arshavin's goal in the 2011 Champions League game between Arsenal and Barcelona.
 His commentary of the 2012 UEFA Champions League Final between Chelsea and Bayern Munich. Tyler's commentary over Didier Drogba's winning penalty ("He's done it!") has subsequently been adopted into meme culture.
 His commentary on the last game of the 2011–12 Premier League season. His exclamation when Sergio Agüero netted a late winner against Queens Park Rangers for Manchester City to win their first Premier League title is one of his most famous pieces of commentary. Tyler later said he was "glad he didn't mess it up".
 Lionel Messi's stunning solo effort against Bayern Munich in the semi final of the 2015 Champions League was deemed "Absolutely world class" by Tyler.
 Cristiano Ronaldo's equalizer against Spain in the 2018 FIFA World Cup

References

External links 

 Sky Sports Columnist – Martin Tyler
 Martin Tyler interview
 

1945 births
Living people
People educated at Royal Grammar School, Guildford
Alumni of the University of East Anglia
English association football commentators
English sportswriters
The Times people
Corinthian-Casuals F.C. players
People from Chester
Major League Baseball broadcasters
Association footballers not categorized by position
English footballers
North American Soccer League (1968–1984) commentators
Sky Sports presenters and reporters